"Early Christmas Morning" is a song by American recording artist Cyndi Lauper, from her sixth studio album and first Christmas album, Merry Christmas...Have a Nice Life (1998). Written by Lauper along with Jan Pulsford in 1996. It was only officially released in Japan.

There are two versions of the song. The second version includes a children's choir instead of the Japanese vocals used in the first version.

The track now appears on several Christmas compilation albums in the United Kingdom and Canada, including Holiday Wishes Favourites released in 2009 by Sony Music Entertainment.

Track list
Japan CD single
Early Christmas Morning (radio edit) – 4:26

References

1998 songs
1998 singles
American Christmas songs
Cyndi Lauper songs
Songs written by Cyndi Lauper
Songs written by Jan Pulsford